Yashika Aanand (born 4 August 1999) is an Indian actress, model and television personality, who works predominantly in Tamil films and television shows.

Early life 
Yashika Aannand was born into a Punjabi Hindu family on 4 August 1999 in New Delhi. After her family moved to Chennai, she completed her schooling in Sherwood Hall school in Chetpet, Chennai.

Career 
Aannand began acting after being an Instagram model. At 14, she was filmed for Inimey Ippadithan (2015) alongside Santhanam but her role was later deleted after she could not attend a song shoot. She then portrayed a swimming instructor in Kavalai Vendam (2016), which became her first theatrical release.

Aannand's breakthrough was in the 2016 film, Dhuruvangal Pathinaaru. Shot on a small budget, the film was successful and won recognition for its cast members. She then appeared in Paadam (2018) and Thambi Ramaiah's Maniyaar Kudumbam (2018).

Aannand then appeared in Iruttu Araiyil Murattu Kuththu (2018), an adult comedy film. Shot in Thailand, the film featured her alongside other actresses such as Vaibhavi Shandilya and Chandrika Ravi and the film performed well at the box office. 
In 2018, Aannand appeared in the second season of the Bigg Boss Tamil reality show hosted by Kamal Haasan. She had earlier been approached to be in the inaugural season, but she refused the offer. She was evicted on day 98, finishing the show in fifth place. She also received the cash prize of 5 lakhs for winning certain tasks during the second season of the premiere program before getting evicted. She later appeared as a mentor in Star Vijay's Jodi Unlimited TV series, which aired in 2019.

Aannand then appeared in the animated zombie film Zombie as the lead actress.

In 2018, she was listed by the Chennai Times as the "most desirable woman on television."

In 2021, she received the Best Actress Award at the Las Vegas Independent Film Festival 2021 for the film Bestie.

MeToo allegations 
In 2018, Aannand identified herself as a victim during the MeToo campaign in India, where she alleged that a director had tried to abuse her by asking for sexual favors in order to gain a part in his film. She refused, and accused the director of harassing her.

Personal life 
On 24 July 2021, Aannand was involved in a car crash in Mahabalipuram near Chennai and was critically injured during the crash. She was traveling with friends when their car rammed into a divider and fell in the nearby pit. News reports state that one of her friends died on the spot. Onlookers reportedly said that the actor's SUV was speeding and lost control, thus causing the crash.

Aannand has regularly raised awareness for female empowerment in society.

Filmography

Film

Television

Short films

Web series

References

External links 

 

1999 births
Living people
Punjabi people
Punjabi Hindus
Indian film actresses
Female models from Delhi
Actresses in Tamil cinema
Tamil actresses
21st-century Indian actresses
Actresses from New Delhi
21st-century Indian child actresses
Bigg Boss (Tamil TV series) contestants
Actresses in Tamil television